Fetra Ratsimiziva (born in Antananarivo on 5 August 1991) is a judoka who represented Madagascar at the 2012 Summer Olympics. He was one of three sportspeople on the team to qualify for the Olympics rather than win a wild-card spot. In the Men's 81kg event, he lost to Emmanuel Lucenti of Argentina in the second round.

He won a silver medal at 2011 African Judo Championships, that year he also won a bronze medal at the African Games.  In 2020, he won a bronze medal at the African Judo Championships which took place in his homeland.

References 

People from Antananarivo
1991 births
Living people
Malagasy male judoka
Olympic judoka of Madagascar
Judoka at the 2012 Summer Olympics
African Games bronze medalists for Madagascar
African Games medalists in judo
Competitors at the 2011 All-Africa Games